Sri Saddharmagupta Piriven Vihara is an old Piriven Vihara in Dombawela, Sri Lanka. The temple has been formally recognised by the Government as an archaeological protected monument in Sri Lanka.

The temple
The temple consists mainly of a Stupa, image house, Bodhi Tree, bell tower, preaching hall, library and Bhikku dwellings. The old library building of the Vihara was conserved in 2010 by the archaeological department. The Dhamma discourse hall is built in the middle of the grounds of the Vihara and its canopy is decorated with old floral diagrams and other various designs.

References

Buddhist temples in Gampaha District
Archaeological protected monuments in Gampaha District